XHRGO-FM is a noncommercial radio station on 104.7 FM in Tala, Jalisco, known as Radio Cañaveral.

History
XHRGO received its permit on July 20, 1999.

In 2009, Orozco González, the permitholder, was fined by the RTC for playing narcocorridos.

References

Radio stations in Jalisco